Īrṣyā (Sanskrit; Pali: issā; Tibetan: phrag dog) is a Sanskrit or Buddhist term that is translated as "jealousy" or "envy". It is defined as a state of mind in which one is highly agitated to obtain wealth and honor for oneself, but unable to bear the excellence of others. 

Irshya is identified as:
 One of the fourteen unwholesome mental factors within the Theravada Abhidharma teachings
Belonging to the category of dosa within the Theravada tradition
 One of the ten fetters in the Theravada tradition (according to the Dhammasangani)
 One of the twenty subsidiary unwholesome mental factors  within the Mahayana Abhidharma teachings
One of the five poisons within the Mahayana tradition
Belonging to the category of anger (Sanskrit: pratigha) within the Mahayana tradition

See also
 Kleshas (Buddhism)
 Mental factors (Buddhism)
 Three poisons

References

Sources
 Berzin, Alexander (2006), Primary Minds and the 51 Mental Factors
 Goleman, Daniel (2008). Destructive Emotions: A Scientific Dialogue with the Dalai Lama. Bantam. Kindle Edition.
 Guenther, Herbert V. &  Leslie S. Kawamura (1975), Mind in Buddhist Psychology: A Translation of Ye-shes rgyal-mtshan's "The Necklace of Clear Understanding" Dharma Publishing. Kindle Edition.
 Kunsang, Erik Pema (translator) (2004). Gateway to Knowledge, Vol. 1. North Atlantic Books.

External links
 Irshya Meaning
 Ranjung Yeshe wiki entry for phrag dog
 Berzin Archives glossary entry for "jealousy"
 Strategies for Deconstructing Jealousy, by Alexander Berzin

Unwholesome factors in Buddhism
Sanskrit words and phrases